Giuma Ahmad Atigha (born 1950) is a Libyan politician who has served as Deputy President of the General National Congress of Libya since 2012, and Acting President of the General National Congress of Libya from the resignation of Mohamed Yousef el-Magariaf on 28 May 2013 to 25 June 2013.

Political career 

On 7 July 2012, Giuma Ahmed Atigha was elected as an independent congressman in the 2012 Congressional election. On 10 August, he was elected as deputy president of the General National Congress. Atigha became the acting president of the Congress after the resignation of Mohammed Magariaf. As caretaker head of state, he became the Commander-in-chief of the army.

References

1950 births
Government ministers of Libya
Heads of state of Libya
Living people
People of the First Libyan Civil War